Andrea Wilson Nightingale (born 1959) is an American scholar working in the field of Classics.  She is a Professor of Classics at Stanford University.  She works on Ancient philosophy and literature, focusing on the intersection of philosophy and literature.  She has also taught and written on ecological issues from a literary and philosophical point of view.

Life 
Nightingale was educated at Stanford University (BA in Classics), Magdelen College, Oxford (2nd BA in Classics), and at the University of California, Berkeley (PhD in Classics).

She has been awarded the Marshall Scholarship, the Guggenheim Fellowship, a fellowship from the American Council of Learned Societies, and a fellowship at the Stanford Humanities Center.  She has also received the Gordon and Dailey Pattee Faculty Fellowship (1999-2000) and the Deans Teaching Award at Stanford (1996-1997).

Nightingale was appointed as a Comparative Literature Professor at Stanford in September 2004.  She served as a Stanford Fellow from 2004 to 2006. She served as a Harvard Senior Fellow of the Center for Hellenic Studies from 2009 to 2013.

Works 
 Genres in Dialogue: Plato and the Construct of Philosophy, Cambridge: Cambridge University Press, 1995, 
 Spectacles of Truth in Classical Greek Philosophy:  Theoria in its Cultural Context, Cambridge: Cambridge University Press, 2004, 
 Ancient Models of Mind: Studies in Human and Divine Rationality, Cambridge: Cambridge University Press, 2010 (co-editor), 
 Once out of Nature: Augustine on Time and the Body, Chicago: University of Chicago Press, 2011,

Radio shows
“Epicurus and Epicureanism,” one-hour show on “ Entitled Opinions (on Life and Literature)” with Robert Harrison (KZSU 90.1 FM), Nov. 8, 2005.
“Plato and Love and Beauty,” one-hour show on “Entitled Opinions (on Life and Literature)” with Robert Harrison (KZSU 90.1 FM), Nov. 26, 2009.
“Moby Dick,” one-hour show on “Entitled Opinions (on Life and Literature)” with Robert Harrison (KZSU 90.1 FM), Jan. 11, 2011.

References 

1950 births
Living people
University of California, Berkeley alumni
21st-century American philosophers
American classical scholars
Women classical scholars
Philosophers from California
Stanford University Department of Classics faculty
Place of birth missing (living people)
American scholars of ancient Greek philosophy